Patrick Chaize (born 23 March 1963) is a French Republican politician. He has been a member of the Senate representing the department of Ain since 2014.

He was re-elected in the 2020 French Senate election.

References 

Living people
1963 births
21st-century French politicians
Senators of Ain
People from Rhône (department)
The Republicans (France) politicians